Philip Oltermann (born 1981) is a German-born British journalist and the current chief of The Guardians Berlin bureau. He is the author of How to Write (2012), Keeping Up with the Germans: A History of Anglo-German Encounters (2012), and The Stasi Poetry Circle (2020).

Early life and career 
Born in Schleswig-Holstein, Oltermann read English and German literature at Oxford University. Oltermann has written for both German and English-language newspapers, including Granta, London Review of Books, Prospect, The Nation, Süddeutsche Zeitung, and others. His book Keeping Up with the Germans was well received. He has been The Guardians bureau chief in Berlin since 2016.

References

External links 
 Philip Oltermann on The Guardian
 Philip Oltermann on the New Statesman

1981 births
Alumni of the University of Oxford
German emigrants to the United Kingdom
The Guardian journalists
Living people
Writers from Schleswig-Holstein